The 2014 Historic Grand Prix of Monaco was the ninth running of the Historic Grand Prix of Monaco, a motor racing event for heritage Grand Prix, Voiturettes, Formula One, Formula Two and Sports cars.

Report 
The festivities included demonstrations in the Renault RS01 and RE40 turbocharged F1 cars. They were driven across the weekend by Damon Hill, Alain Prost and Jean-Pierre Jabouille. In addition, Johnny Herbert demonstrated a March 701 and Jacky Ickx took to the wheel of an Auto Union.

Race A was closely fought between the ERA of polesitter Paddins Dowling and the Alfa Romeo Tipo B of Matthew Grist, with Grist winning by a slender margin.

For Race C, Motor Sport journalist Andrew Frankel drove a Jaguar C-Type from England to Monaco and back to compete in the event. The trip was a homage to journalist and racer Tommy Wisdom, who had performed the same journey in 1952 for the only sportscar race held at Monaco; it was done in the same car, chassis XKC005. Frankel wrote about his experiences of the journey and the event in a later magazine column.

In Race D, Joe Colasacco ran strongly in his Ferrari 1512 which had debuted at the previous event in 2012 until he lost second gear.

Race E was a close battle between leader Katsuaki Kubota and second-placed driver Michael Lyons, until Lyons' car developed a misfire and he retired after 10 laps. Second place was eventually taken by Duncan Dayton, with a decisive overtake on Robert Hall at Tabac. The race was red-flagged after a collision between Richard Smeeton and John Goodman.

Michael Lyons cruised to victory in Race F after his main rivals hit trouble: Nathan Kinch crashed in qualifying and front-row qualifier Sam Hancock was relegated to the back after clutch problems on the opening lap. Hancock recovered to seventh by the end of the race. This race was also red-flagged after Kubota crashed at Massenet.

David Shaw qualified on pole for Race G, but jumped the start and was handed a drive-through penalty. The battle for the lead was hotly contested, eventually being settled in favour of Paolo Barilla. A notable car in this race was the MP 301, the only Monégasque car of the weekend. It had been constructed by Société Monégasque de Constructions Automobiles MP, a manufacturer co-founded by Marco Piccinini before he became Team Principal at Scuderia Ferrari.

Results

Summary

Série A: Pre-war Voiturettes and Grand Prix cars

Série B:  Pre–1961 F1 Grand Prix cars and F2

Série C: Sports racing cars raced from 1952 to 1955 inclusive

Série D: 1500cc F1 Grand Prix cars from 1961 to 1965 inclusive

Série E: F1 Grand Prix cars from 1966 to 1972 inclusive

Série F: F1 cars, non- ground effects, from 1973 to 1978 inclusive

Série G: 2-litre, F3 cars from 1974 to 1978 inclusive

References 

Historic motorsport events
Monaco Grand Prix
Historic Grand Prix of Monaco
Historic Grand Prix of Monaco